The Winduwinda were an indigenous Australian people of Queensland.

Name
The name Winduwinda, like that of the Wik-Munkan, is used to refer to either to a single tribe or an aggregation of approximately 12 tribes.

Languages
Languages named after Winduwinda creak are
 Awngthim (Mamangit/Mamangidigh/Mamangathi), including Ntrwa'ngayth (Ndraangit) and Thaynakwith (Tanikuit) dialects
 Anguthimri, specifically Alngith (Alingit), Linngithigh (Lenginiti), Ntra'ngith (Ndwangit) dialects
 Ngkoth (Nggot), including Ungawangadi (Ngawangati)
 Arritinngithigh, specifically Ladamngid (Latamngit) dialect
 Mpalitjanh (Mbalidjan), perhaps a dialect of Luthigh
 Ndorndorin, unattested but possibly a Wik language

Country
Their inland extension reached to the headwaters of the Embley River.

Social organization
How one defines the social structure of the Winduwinda depends on whether one takes Winduwinda to refer to one tribe composed of hordes, or whether several of these bands were actually distinct tribes. Tindale mentions only two hordes for the Winduwinda in a strict sense, namely:
 Mbalidjan
 (?)Ndorndorin.

He then outlines the twelve hordes or tribes - the distinction is unclear - associated with the Winduwinda:-

 (1) Tanikuit. (Tainikudi, Tani-kutti, Dainiguid, Tanna-gootee).Locality: on the northern side of Albatross Bay.
 (2) Ndruangit. On the northern side of Mission River.
 (3) Ndwangit. (Ndwongit). Northern side of Mission River.
 (4) Ngawangati. (Ngawataingeti, Ungauwangati). Lower Mission River.
 (5) Alingit. (Lengiti, Lenngiti, Alngid, Limretti [?]. Includes Weipa and the area to east of it.
 (6) Mamangit. (Mamangiti, Mamngaid). South side of Albatross Bay.
 (7) Latamngit. (Lätamngit). West bank of the Hay River.
 (8) Nggot. (Gott). The southern side of the Embley River.
 (9) Aretinget. (Aretingit, Aritingiti, Adetingiti). The upper Hay River, and across to Pera Head.
 (10)Ndraangit. (different locality to Ndruangit). Coast near False Pera Head.
 (11) Leningiti. (Laini-ngitti, not the same as "Lengiti" of Weipa, Leningit) The area west of the lower Watson River and also Aurukun.
 (12). Anjingit (Andjingit, Anyingit, Anjingat, Andyingati? Anangit). On the west coast just to the north of the Archer River.

Alternative names
 Mbalidjan
 Ndorndorin
 Ngwatainggeti
 Wikwija (Wik-Munkan exonym signifying 'bad speech')
 Windawinda

Source:

Notes

Citations

Sources

 

Aboriginal peoples of Queensland